Eirik Paulsen (born 21 May 1970) is a Norwegian former ice hockey player. He was born in Stavanger, Norway and played for the club Viking IK. He played for the Norwegian national ice hockey team at the 1992 Winter Olympics.

References

External links

1970 births
Living people
Ice hockey players at the 1992 Winter Olympics
Norwegian ice hockey players
Olympic ice hockey players of Norway
Sportspeople from Stavanger